The William J. Bernd House is located in New Richmond, Wisconsin, United States. It is one of two houses sharing the name in New Richmond. The house was added to the National Register of Historic Places in 1988.

The exterior of this two-story clapboard house was then essentially original, in a patternbook Queen Anne style.

It has dormers in its roof and a full one-story front porch with Doric capitals upon its columns, and lattice work at its foundation.

See also
William J. Bernd House (Second Street, New Richmond, Wisconsin)

References

Houses completed in 1907
Houses in St. Croix County, Wisconsin
Houses on the National Register of Historic Places in Wisconsin
Queen Anne architecture in Wisconsin
National Register of Historic Places in St. Croix County, Wisconsin